The Legs of Dolores is a 1957 West German musical comedy film directed by Géza von Cziffra and starring Germaine Damar, Claus Biederstaedt, and Ruth Stephan.

It was shot at the Wandsbek Studios in Hamburg. The film's sets were designed by the art directors Dieter Bartels and Theo Zwierski.

Cast

References

Bibliography

External links 
 

1957 films
West German films
German musical comedy films
1957 musical comedy films
1950s German-language films
Films directed by Géza von Cziffra
Films shot at Wandsbek Studios
Constantin Film films
1950s German films